The 2008 New South Wales Swifts season was the inaugural season for both New South Wales Swifts and the ANZ Championship. Swifts were formed in late 2007 when Netball New South Wales merged its two former Commonwealth Bank Trophy league teams, Sydney Swifts and Hunter Jaegers, in order to enter a single team in the 2008 ANZ Championship. With a team coached by Julie Fitzgerald and captained by Catherine Cox, Swifts won 10 of their 13 matches during the regular season and finished second behind Waikato Bay of Plenty Magic. Swifts subsequently defeated Magic in both the major semi–final and the grand final to become the inaugural ANZ Championship winners.

Players

Player movements

Notes
  Eight members of the 2008 New South Wales Swifts squad had been members of the 2007 Sydney Swifts squad that had won the Commonwealth Bank Trophy league title.
  Megan Dehn was originally a member of the 2008 Swifts squad but subsequently withdrew and joined Southern Steel.

Roster

Regular season
On 7 April, Swifts made their ANZ Championship debut against Southern Steel at the Acer Arena. During the regular season Swifts won 10 of their 13 matches and finished second behind Waikato Bay of Plenty Magic.

Fixtures and results
Round 1

Round 2

Round 3

Round 4

Round 5

Round 6

Round 7

Round 8

Round 9
 received a bye.
Round 10
 
Round 11

Round 12

Round 13

Round 14

Final table

Playoffs
Swifts defeated Magic in both the major semi–final and the grand final to become the inaugural ANZ Championship winners.

Major semi-final

Grand final

Award winners

ANZ Championship awards

Australian Netball Awards

Swifts awards

References

New South Wales Swifts seasons
New South Wales Swifts